The 16th Photographic Squadron is an inactive United States Air Force unit.  It was last assigned to the 55th Reconnaissance Group at MacDill Field, Florida, where it was inactivated on 16 December 1947.  It served as a mapping unit during World War II and the initial years of Strategic Air Command

History
Initially activated in March 1942 at Bolling Field as a laboratory for processing photographic products produced by the 1st Mapping Group. During World War II, the squadron was engaged in photographic mapping of areas of the United States with a variety of aircraft.

The squadron moved to Buckley Field in late 1944, where it was assigned to the 311th Photographic Wing, which became the major reconnaissance organization of Strategic Air Command (SAC). It moved to with the wing to MacDill Field, Florida in April 1946 and was assigned to the 55th Reconnaissance Group in 1947.  The squadron was engaged in SAC's strategic mapping mission. The 16th was inactivated in December and its personnel and equipment were transferred to the 16th Photographic Reconnaissance Squadron (Special), which was simultaneously activated.

Lineage
 Constituted as the Photographic Laboratory Unit on 27 March 1942
 Activated on 31 March 1942
 Redesignated 16th Photographic Squadron on 8 July 1942
 Redesignated 16th Photographic Unit on 1 February 1943
 Redesignated 16th Domestic Photographic Unit on 11 August 1943
 Redesignated 16th Photographic Squadron (Special Purpose) on 14 September 1944
 Inactivated on 16 December 1947

Assignments
 1st Mapping Group (later 1at Photographic Charting Group), 31 March 1942
 11th Photographic Group, 1 December 1943
 311th Photographic Wing, 5 October 1944
 55th Reconnaissance Group, 1 Jun 1947 – 16 Dec 1947

Stations
 Bolling Field, District of Columbia, 31 March 1942
 Buckley Field, Colorado, 1 November 1944
 MacDill Field, Florida, 19 April 1946 – 16 December 1947

Aircraft

 Cessna C-78 Bobcat (1942-1944)
 Beechcraft C-45 Expeditor (1944-1947)
 Beechcraft F-2 Expeditor (1944-1947)
 Boeing B-17 Flying Fortress (1946-1947)
 Boeing F-9 Flying Fortress (1946-1947)
 Consolidated OA-10 Catalina (1943)
 Grumman OA-13 Goose (1943)
 Beechcraft AT-7 Navigator(1943)
 Beechcraft AT-11 Kansan (1943-1946)
 Boeing F-13 Superfortress (1947)

Service Streamer

See also

 List of B-29 Superfortress operators

References

Notes
 Explanatory notes

 Citations

Bibliography

 
 

Military units and formations established in 1942
016
Units and formations of Strategic Air Command
American Theater of World War II
1942 establishments in Washington, D.C.